Robert Archbold (died 26 February 1855) was an Irish Whig politician.

References

External links
 

UK MPs 1837–1841
UK MPs 1841–1847
Whig (British political party) MPs for Irish constituencies
1855 deaths